Out on a Limb is a 1992 comedy film written by Joshua and Daniel Goldin and directed by Francis Veber. It stars Matthew Broderick, Jeffrey Jones, Heidi Kling, Courtney Peldon, Michael Monks, and John C. Reilly.

The film was released by Universal Pictures on September 4, 1992. This was the first movie that Broderick and Jones starred in together since Ferris Bueller's Day Off was released six years earlier.

Plot
Hotshot businessman Bill Campbell (Broderick) has returned to his hometown of Buzzsaw at the request of his younger sister Marci (Peldon), who is convinced that their stepfather Mayor Van Der Haven (Jones) has been murdered and replaced by his twin brother Matt Skearns.

On the way to Buzzsaw, Bill's car and clothes (including his wallet which contains an important contact number) are stolen by a woman named Sally (Kling) and he is forced to hitchhike home naked, where he is picked up by two drunken brothers—both named Jim (Monks and Reilly). Over the course of the day, Campbell must find Sally, retrieve his wallet, and avoid the diabolical Skearns, who is looking for financial compensation after spending 15 years in prison for a crime committed by his twin brother.

The film ends with Skearns driving off a cliff and into a canyon, rather than risk capture by the police. Marci, who tells her classmates what happened, introduces them to her brother and his wife, Sally. Marci also tells her classmates that the Jim brothers were congratulated as heroes for trying to bring a criminal to justice. Both were given jobs as FBI informants.

Cast
Matthew Broderick as Bill Campbell
Jeffrey Jones as Matt Skearns / Peter Van Der Haven
Heidi Kling as Sally
John C. Reilly as Jim Jr.
Marian Mercer as Ann Campbell Van Der Haven
Larry Hankin as Officer Darren
David Margulies as Mr. Buchenwald
Courtney Peldon as Marci Campbell
Michael Monks as Jim Sr.
Andrew Benne as Officer Larry
Mickey Jones as Virgil
Nancy Lenehan as Miss Clayton
Noah Craig Andrews as Julius
Benjamin Diskin as Henry
Adam Wylie as Bob

References

1992 films
1992 comedy films
American comedy films
Films directed by Francis Veber
Universal Pictures films
Interscope Communications films
Films scored by Van Dyke Parks
1990s English-language films
1990s American films